Fallout 76 is a 2018 online action role-playing video game developed by Bethesda Game Studios and published by Bethesda Softworks. It is an installment in the Fallout series and a prequel to previous entries. Fallout 76 is Bethesda Game Studios's first multiplayer game; players explore the open world, which has been torn apart by nuclear war, with others. Bethesda developed the game using a modified version of its Creation Engine, which allowed the accommodation of multiplayer gameplay and a more detailed game world than in previous games.

Fallout 76 was released to generally mixed reviews, with criticism for the game's numerous technical issues, overall design, lack of gameplay purpose, and initial absence of human non-playable characters. The game was the subject of several controversies, chiefly with regard to the quality of physical content. A number of Bethesda's responses and attempts to provide ongoing support for Fallout 76 in the months following its launch were met with criticism. The game sold 1.4 million copies by the end of 2018. Wastelanders, an update that reintroduces non-playable characters in the series, launched in April 2020.

Gameplay
Fallout 76 is Bethesda Game Studios' first online multiplayer game. Players may play individually or with a party of up to three others. The servers for the game are public dedicated servers, with the player automatically allocated to one of them. While the game was expected to launch with public servers only, executive producer Todd Howard revealed plans for private servers to be introduced some time after the game's launch. These private servers allow players to invite friends and to prevent undesirable aspects of player versus player gameplay such as griefing from affecting an individual player's experience of the game. Howard described the delay as being necessary to allow Bethesda time to assure the stability of public servers. Elements of previous Fallout games are present and are modified to work with the real-time game. The V.A.T.S. system—a mechanic in the series that allows players to target specific locations on an enemy's body to attack, which previously paused the game temporarily—is used in Fallout 76 as a real-time system.

The game features an open world four times the size of that of Fallout 4. The game world is called "Appalachia" and is a representation of West Virginia. It features recreations of real locations in the region, including the West Virginia State Capitol, The Greenbrier, Woodburn Circle, New River Gorge Bridge, and Camden Park. The game features numerous new mutated monsters, several of which—such as the Mothman and the Flatwoods monster—were inspired by West Virginian folklore.

The game includes revisions to the SPECIAL progression system. Character attributes fall into one of seven categories: strength, perception, endurance, charisma, intelligence, agility and luck. As the player levels up, they are able to spend skill points to boost their attributes on a scale of one to fifteen. Players are able to choose perks, or passive abilities that offer gameplay bonuses. These perks fall into each of the SPECIAL categories and take the form of trading cards. Each card has a value and the player can adopt perks equal to their respective value; for example, if the player has a strength rating of five, then they may equip strength perks worth five points. The player can merge similar cards together to create more powerful—albeit more expensive—perks. The system is designed to encourage the player to recognise the situation they are in and choose perks that aid them rather than passively selecting them and having them for the duration of the game.

Upon release Fallout 76 did not feature any human non-player characters (NPCs) as all surviving humans are other players. This required Bethesda to change their approach to storytelling as previous games in the series relied on NPCs to assign quests, engage the player in dialog and advance the overall narrative. Fallout 76 instead uses a combination of NPCs in the form of robots, recordings such as collectible holotapes, terminals throughout the game world, and environmental storytelling where the player uncovers fragments of a narrative by exploring locations that they piece together themselves. Each of these elements had previously been used in the series, often to provide backstory for characters and the world of the game while remaining separate from the main narrative. According to Howard, this system allows Bethesda to tell a story while giving players a greater ability to create their own narratives. In June 2019, Bethesda announced a major update, which introduces human NPCs, however the update was delayed. Wastelanders was released on April 14, 2020, as well as being released on Steam at the same. Owners of the game through Bethesda.net were able to get a free Steam key until April 12, 2020.

The game expands on Fallout 4s settlements by allowing the player the ability to build bases at many locations of the map. These creations are assigned to the player's profile and are removed from the game world when the player is offline to prevent progress from being lost. While other players are able to attack player settlements while they are online, the game preserves player creations using "blueprints" to prevent players from having to start over if their creations and progress are destroyed.

Players are able to use nuclear weapons to temporarily change the areas of game world. After acquiring launch codes, the player can access missile silos and fire a missile at almost any point on the map. This irradiates the area, which the player can explore to find rare weapons, gear and items. However, it also attracts powerful enemies and the player needs to be sufficiently strong to survive. The game includes a photo mode; the player has the ability to pose their character and choose from a variety of facial expressions and filters.

Game modes
When Fallout 76 was first released, only one game mode was available - the base game described above, subsequently termed "Adventure Mode". From March 2019 to October 2019, a second mode, Survival Mode, was available to players, which mirrored the map and gameplay of the base game, but featured always-on player-versus-player functionality and player-kill leaderboards.

In June 2019, a battle royale game mode, called Nuclear Winter, was added in a beta form open to all players. In Nuclear Winter, the players were set in Vault 51, a fallout shelter whose denizens are forced into a fight to the death by an artificially intelligent overlord. Players (playing solo or in teams of up to four) started off matches in Vault 51, which was set on a timer or until a maximum player count was achieved, which prompted an on-screen map (one of two foreshortened versions of the main Adventure map) to appear where teams could choose where they spawn. Nuclear Winter featured parts from the base game such as building using collected blueprints and the ability to launch nuclear payloads via collecting multiple launch codes and a briefcase. Over the course of the match, the playable area would shrink, forcing players to get closer to one another and hasten the end of the match; the last remaining player or team alive was declared the winner. Nuclear Winter was discontinued in September 2021 upon release of a new set of modes collectively called Fallout Worlds.

In October 2019, after the launch of the premium-pay service Fallout 1st, subscribing members could access another game mode, Private Worlds, which allowed players to host a private version of the Adventure map to explore for themselves and their companions. In September 2021, this mode was rolled into the new Fallout Worlds update, which allows players to make private worlds with customized settings relating to creatures, damage, weather, building capabilities, and other game parameters. , Fallout Worlds adds two game modes: Public Worlds (a rotating, publicly-accessible mode with altered parameters set by the developers) and Custom Worlds (a privately-accessible mode with altered parameters set by a player-designer who must be a paying subscriber).

Premise

Fallout 76 is a narrative prequel to previous Fallout games. It is set in an alternate history, and takes place in 2102, twenty-five years after a nuclear war that devastated the Earth. The player character is a resident of Vault 76, a fallout shelter that was built in West Virginia to house America's best and brightest minds. The player character exits the Vault on "Reclamation Day" as part of a plan to re-colonize the Wasteland.

Plot

Fallout 76
Twenty-five years after the Great War, Vault 76 is opened up and its residents given the task of repopulating the Wasteland. Shortly after they emerge from the Vault, the player character is contacted by the Vault Overseer. She reveals that Vault 76 was given a secret mandate to secure an arsenal of nuclear weapons deployed throughout Appalachia in three still-functioning nuclear missile silos: Site Alpha, Site Bravo, and Site Charlie. The player character is directed to contact the Responders, a faction of emergency services personnel who tried to aid the residents of Appalachia during the war; however, they discover that the Responders evacuated after they came under attack from the Scorched. Further investigation reveals that the Scorched are human beings infected by the "Scorched Plague", and are led by the Scorchbeasts; massive mutated bats that came into contact with an Enclave bioweapon kept in an old mining facility, causing exponential growth and a symbiotic control over the plague that created them. This relationship with the plague elevates a single Scorchbeast to the role of Queen, making it far larger and more dangerous, and allowing it to lead the legions of humans and animals in Appalachia through the use of a hivemind.

As the Scorched represent a threat to the Wasteland beyond Appalachia, the player character decides to secure a nuclear weapon and use it to destroy a Scorchbeast nest. In order to achieve this, they start searching the bunkers of survivalists calling themselves the Free States who were working on the means to detect the Scorched until the Scorched overran them. The player character is able to build a radar system that detects the viral signature of the Scorched, but its limited range makes it ineffective. The player attempts to boost the signal first by gaining the friendship of Rose, a Miss Nanny robot trying to rebuild the local Raider gangs that lived in Appalachia before being scared off by the Scorched; and then by investigating research done by the local Brotherhood of Steel into the Scorchbeast as they had tried to stop it spreading from its main lair. The player hacks into a government network and draw the attention of the Enclave, the remnants of the United States government. The Enclave are led by MODUS, a centralized artificial intelligence system located in a secure nuclear fallout bunker beneath the Whitespring Resort. MODUS asks the player character to help connect them to a series of isolated computer networks across Appalachia through the Sugar Grove SIGINT base and reestablish contact with the Kovac-Muldoon orbital platform, and in return offers to connect to the radar system to detect Scorched across the region.

Once MODUS is connected, they are able to identify the Scorchbeast nest at a location called Fissure Site Prime, close to where the Brotherhood of Steel had made their ultimate attempt to stop the Scorchbeast threat themselves and failed. The player character is directed to one of the three nuclear silos and they launch a missile at the nest. Venturing into the irradiated area, they uncover a laboratory at the center of the nest that was also found by the Brotherhood of Steel, implying that the Scorchbeasts were man-made. The explosion awakens a Scorchbeast Queen, and the player is forced to fight her. With the Queen defeated, the Scorchbeasts' hive mind is broken, and the threat to the wasteland beyond Appalachia is halted. The player character rejoins the other residents of Vault 76 in rebuilding the Wasteland.

Wastelanders
In 2103, one year after Vault 76 opened, people have begun returning to Appalachia. They have been drawn to the region by rumors of safety, and of treasure hidden in the mountains. The Vault 76 Overseer grows concerned for their welfare as the Scorched and Scorchbeasts remain a problem in Appalachia. She has the surviving residents of Vault 76 befriend the new arrivals, all while trying to find the source of the rumors.

Two major factions emerge among the new arrivals: the Settlers, led by Paige; and the returning Raiders, led by Meg. After the player reunites with the Overseer, they then assist the Overseer in mass-producing a vaccine at the defunct Nuka-Cola plant, which is then distributed to the population in the form of Nuka-Cola soft drinks, albeit after having to convince the faction leaders of the severity of the threat. With the Settlers and Raiders protected, the Overseer and Vault 76 resident then turn their attention to the rumors of treasure. According to the Overseer, Vault-Tec University housed a secret area where top executives would meet to discuss Top Secret corporate information. She and the resident travel to Vault-Tec University in Morgantown to learn more. They discover that Vault 79 holds the entirety of the United States' gold reserve, transferred there from Fort Knox for safe-keeping in the event of nuclear war, and is well-protected by a series of security defenses. The resident must choose between an alliance with the Settlers or the Raiders when venturing into Vault 79 to acquire the gold. After a series of quests related to "assembling a crew", the time comes to raid the vault, wherein it is discovered that remnants of the Secret Service garrison is trapped. After deliberation with the agent in charge, the resident and their crew can agree to save the remaining agents in exchange for 1000 gold bars worth of bullion, inaccessible to the agents, and stuck in the processing room. After acquiring the bars, and lifting the accidental lockdown, the resident can divide the gold however they see fit, either keeping every bar, keeping half and giving the other half to the faction they raided with, or keeping half and giving both factions a quarter. This bullion is to be used to re-establish a gold backed currency all across America, though depending on the player's choices and greed, it could spell immense recession and strife across the region, pitting the Settlers and Raiders against each other in a battle for total conquest, and returning Appalachia to the turmoil it just broke free from.

Steel Dawn
Several months after people began returning to Appalachia, Elder Maxson has sent the Brotherhood First Expeditionary Force from New California to Appalachia to not only find out what happened to Paladin Taggerdy's Brotherhood, but reestablish the Brotherhood of Steel's presence in the region as well. However, despite losing most of the initial group to Raider attacks on the way across the devastated United States, Paladin Rahmani, Scribe Valdez, and Knight Shin make it to Appalachia, and using the fortified ATLAS Observatory as their new base of operations, renaming it Fort Atlas, they begin to rebuild the Brotherhood's presence in the region, all while dealing with gaining the alliance and friendship of the Settlers of Foundation, and the hostility of the Raiders at the Crater, with being supported by the residents of Vault 76 with securing munitions and other resources to help protect everyone in the region from the continued threat of the Scorched and Scorchbeasts.

Steel Reign
By the year 2104, things have been going well in the Appalachian Wasteland thanks to the residents of Vault 76 and their continued support of both the Settlers in Foundation, and the Raiders in Crater, but the Brotherhood of Steel First Expeditionary Force that arrived some time ago is still splintered because of hostilities between Paladin Rahmani and Knight Shin over their primary objective, not helped by the continued attacks by Super Mutants and other threats that were released by the Enclave before they were wiped out in the years before Vault 76 opened. The residents have to make a tough choice with deciding what the primary objective for Rahmani's Brotherhood will be from this point onward: Support and protect the people of the Appalachian Wasteland, or continue the Brotherhood's duty of securing all manner of weapons from the pre-War world to ensure they don't fall into the wrong hands. Without contact with Maxson and Lost Hills anymore, the Brotherhood's future may depend on the residents of Vault 76.

Expeditions: The Pitt
After being wiped out by the Scorchbeasts prior to the opening of Vault 76, the Responders have returned to Appalachia and set up their new home base at the Whitespring Resort, also having gained access to a still-working Vertibird to travel beyond Appalachia to help others in need of assistance, such as those people surviving in the ruins of Pittsburgh, Pennsylvania, now known as "The Pitt" following the Great War. With the help of the residents of Vault 76, the Responders are able to aid the Pittsburg Union, a group of survivors under attack from a raider group known as the Fanatics, and continue to aid them thanks to the Vault 76 residents to further help rebuild the United States from the ashes of nuclear annihilation.

Development
Fallout 76 uses a modified version of Bethesda's Creation Engine designed to accommodate multiplayer gameplay. Work on modifying the engine was carried out by Bethesda Game Studios Austin. The modified engine allowed the development team to incorporate new lighting models, rendering processes and more accurate terrain mapping. These allowed the development team to create a world with sixteen times more detail than was possible with previous iterations of the Creation Engine. The game includes a dynamic weather system that allows for localized climatic conditions and greater draw distances mean that these weather events can be observed by the player from far away. As with many previous games in the series, its musical score was composed by Inon Zur.

Pre-release 

The game was announced on May 30, 2018; the announcement was preceded by a twenty-four hour live stream on Twitch showing a Vault Boy bobblehead toy in front of a monitor with a "Please Stand By" test pattern screen, a signature image of the series. This stream was watched by a total of over two million people, with more than one hundred thousand people watching at any time.

Details of the game were announced by Bethesda Executive Producer Todd Howard during Bethesda's press conference at E3 2018 on June 10, 2018, including its anticipated release date of November 14, 2018. As it is Bethesda Game Studio's first experience with a fully online game, Howard confirmed that there would be an open beta phase, beginning on October 23, 2018 for Xbox One, and October 30, 2018 for PlayStation 4 and PC.

In response to the announcement that Fallout 76 would feature only multiplayer, a petition was created by fans of the series which called for the game to include a single-player mode. The petition received thousands of signatures within a day. Following the game's announcement, there was a burst of interest in tourism in West Virginia. The website "West Virginia Explorer" reported an increase of fifteen times the visitors to the site in the days after the announcement, while management of the Camden Park amusement park said there was an increase in people looking to purchase park merchandise.

The teaser trailer shown at E3 2018 featured a cover version of John Denver's song "Take Me Home, Country Roads". Fans of the series expressed interest in the song, prompting Bethesda to announce plans to release the song on digital musical services, with all proceeds from it being donated to Habitat for Humanity, assuring a minimum  donation. In Australia, a free Fallout 76 vinyl containing the cover of "Take Me Home, Country Roads" was included as a promotion with the December 2018 issue of Stack magazine, available at retailer JB Hi-Fi.

Post-release
Beyond the launch of Fallout 76, the game continued to receive further development support from Bethesda to improve or alter its design, combat technical issues, and take action against users seen as cheating. However, many of the decisions undertaken by the publisher to implement these aims garnered disgruntlement and criticism from players and gaming journalists.

In December 2018, the prices of Fallout 76 in-game cosmetics received increasingly negative attention from players for being too expensive, particularly in regards to items added for the 2018 holiday season. Eurogamer noted how a set of Santa Claus outfits and a large sign cost $20 and $14 worth of in-game currency (called Atoms), respectively, with players arguing similar pricing was enough to buy Fallout 4 season pass with all add-ons. In the spring and summer of 2019, the game also introduced items that managed a player's surplus inventory and improved the quality of their weapons, both of which could be acquired through spending Atoms. However, the implementation drew criticism from players, who felt that it favored those that paid for Atoms with real money instead of gaining them through hours of playtime. Additional items released later that also provided gameplay advantages and were buyable with Atoms drew similar criticism. Polygon wrote the in-game store had "slowly warped over time", particularly as it had initially only offered cosmetic items for sale.

In the weeks following release, Bethesda banned numerous players from the game for using mods and exploiting technical issues for various purposes. Such examples included duplicating in-game items, and gaining access to the game's developer room, an off-limits area created for testing purposes which contained copies of every item. Many of these players found that their accounts had been closed without warning, and were emailed by Bethesda asking them to write an essay explaining why cheating and using mod software was damaging to online video games. Bethesda's reaction received backlash from users as many felt they had been unfairly targeted for using mods to fix graphical or technical issues with the game, rather than with the intention to gain unfair advantages. Fallout 76s in-game currency also became affected by hackers due to the mass duplication of items, much of which were sold using unofficial methods outside of the game. Various players took it upon themselves to combat item duplication by hunting down and killing any player-characters suspected of using them, despite a number being in fact innocent. Other examples of hacking were achieved in Fallout 76; for example, in December 2019 alone, users succeeded in incorporating numerous NPCs and objects into the game, some of which had been taken from Fallout 4. Later that same month, hackers managed to open other online players' inventories and steal hundreds of their items. While Bethesda took action to combat these, many users called on the publisher to implement more rigorous anti-cheat protection for the game and to be more forceful in banning the accounts of those caught hacking.

On October 23, 2019, Bethesda announced it would be selling a premium subscription service for Fallout 76, titled "Fallout 1st", priced at $12.99 per month or $99.99 per year. The subscription allows payees to play the game in a private online server (either alone or in a group of up to seven people, who do not have to be subscribers). It also introduces new content such as a box allowing unlimited storage for crafting materials, a placeable fast travel system with supplementary supplies, 1650 atoms per month, and exclusive cosmetic items. The choice to release a subscription model for the game drew criticism and was considered an audacious move from Bethesda, particularity as content like private worlds had been requested before the game's launch by players but was instead now included behind a paywall. Some noted that subscription services for exclusive content in full-priced games were being shunned in favor of other models. Kotaku contested the high price, writing how the base game, while having improved in time through new content following its poor launch, still suffered from various problems, and additionally was continuing to be sold for a discounted price at most retailers.

Reception

Critical response

According to review aggregator Metacritic, the PC and PlayStation 4 versions received "mixed or average" reviews, while the Xbox One version received "generally unfavorable" reviews. The numerous negative reviews from critics led Forbes to describe the release of Fallout 76 as a "historically bad launch" and to question if Bethesda would consider the property "worth saving" moving forward.

The Guardian called the game "a pointless walk in the post-apocalypse" featuring "half-baked conflict and witless quests to unearth the dead". According to Forbes, Fallout 76 was a "huge, rare, total miss" by Bethesda. Eurogamer described the game as a "bizarre, boring, broken mess", adding that, shortly after its launch, it should be considered as a "failed experiment". Business Insider described Fallout 76 as "a jumble of disparate video game elements set loose in an online world, held together by a string of pointless fetch quests and experience points". Newsweek said that moments of the enjoyment during their review were "outweighed by the near-constant performance issues and poorly executed game systems", adding that they were disappointed in the game despite being fans of the series.

PCWorld ended their review early due to their frustration with the game's technical performance, and said that it still would not be a great game to them even if it "functioned properly". GameSpot said that the game "can look and feel like its illustrious predecessors at times, but it's a soulless husk of an experience." According to IGN, "The rich wasteland map of Fallout 76 is wasted on a mess of bugs, conflicting ideas, and monotony." Giant Bomb has said they will not publish a full review due to lack of interest of the staff to play it enough to reach a final verdict. Editor and co-founder Jeff Gerstmann stated on their podcast "No one on staff wants to play any more of this video game."

The game was also criticized for its initial complete absence of interactive human NPCs. GameSpot said that "without having any of those people present to tell their stories personally, [Fallout 76]'s world is limited to being little more than just an environmental exhibit with things to kill", and that "there are no strong emotional anchors to help you become truly invested...". They also wrote that quests simply exist of "long monologues and one-way directives from a person who no longer exists and you can't interact with [...] your actions ultimately won't affect anyone, or the rest of the world for that matter". PC World similarly took issue, writing "robots aren't really NPCs as much as quest dispensers [...] they don't talk with you, they talk at you". Additionally, they disliked the readable terminals and holotapes: "none of it feels important or even particularly interesting" as they were "no substitute for an actual conversation".

Many reviewers noted a large number of bugs and glitches present in Fallout 76, affecting numerous aspects of the game, as well as stability, performance and graphical issues. In response, Bethesda issued several patches, the size of the first being 50GB, which nearly eclipsed the size of the game itself. However, many of the attempted fixes garnered player disgruntlement for failing to resolve some of the more notable technical issues, removing features previously thought intentional, and inadvertently resulting in further bugs, some of which had been fixed previously. A number of fans subsequently expressed their desire for Bethesda to use a public test server for new patches before their release. The game's controversial subscription service also received further negative attention upon its launch in October 2019 due to a range of issues. In particular, players reported that private servers used to present a newly created version of the game's world contained dead NPCs and looted areas, implying that the servers were recycled instances that people had already used. Additionally, players found that they were not able to go "invisible" and restrict their private server to a few select friends; instead, anyone on their friends list could see and join the server. Another technical issue with the subscription model concerned a box that allowed for an unlimited depositing of crafting materials, with players storing their items accordingly and then returning later to find that the contents of the box had disappeared.

On December 22, 2018, as a way of apology for the criticism surrounding Fallout 76, Bethesda announced that they would give all players of Fallout 76 a free copy of the Fallout Classic Collection, available on PC, which consists of Fallout, Fallout 2, and Fallout Tactics: Brotherhood of Steel. In an interview with IGN on June 2, 2019, Todd Howard addressed the launch of Fallout 76 and that the negative reactions had been anticipated by Bethesda, saying, "We knew we were going to have a lot of bumps. That's a difficult development; a lot of new systems and things like that [...] a lot of those difficulties ended up on the screen. We knew, hey look, this is not the type of game that people are used to from us and we're going to get some criticism on it. A lot of that—very well-deserved criticism [...] This is not gonna be a high Metacritic game. This is not what this is." Howard also expressed regret at not releasing a beta version of the game several months before release to gain feedback. Despite this, he believed that Fallout 76s reception would improve over time from ongoing support, and that this mattered more for a game than how it started out: "It's not how you launch, it's what it becomes [...] It's [Fallout 76] really turned around. It's a fabulous game with an incredible community."

Wastelanders
With the release of the Wastelanders expansion, the game saw improved reception from critics. On Metacritic, the Wastelanders expansion had an aggregate score of 68/100 for Windows, and 63/100 for PlayStation 4 based on updated reviews. IGN David Jagneaux's review of Wastelanders scored the update a 6 of 10, but stated that Wastelanders "is a dramatic overhaul of Appalachia from top to bottom it desperately needed. It finally introduces mostly interesting human NPCs, an abundance of fun new quests, and satisfying alterations to existing areas. As a result, Fallout 76 is starting to feel like a true Fallout game – even if it’s still not as consistently enjoyable as its predecessors." PCWorld said "It's still not as good as a proper offline Fallout sequel, but Fallout 76's Wastelanders expansion injects some much-needed personality into post-apocalyptic West Virginia." GameSpot wrote that "Wastelanders introduces some of the best Fallout sequences in recent years, but you'll have to dig through a lot of Fallout 76's enduring issues to experience them." Nate Crowley of Rock, Paper, Shotgun said of the improvements, "The mood of the game, for want of a better word, is transformed: what was once hollow now feels fleshed out, and what was lifeless now feels at least intermittently busy. I’ve still got a lot of issues with Fallout 76, but they’re starting to feel fixable, or at least easier to overlook."

When the game, with the new Wastelanders expansion, was released on Steam in April 2020, it was initially review bombed by users generally upset over the game's original state when it was first released. However, other users on Steam and other community sites have worked to try to counter that perception of the game to newer players or interested buyers, pointing out that, like Final Fantasy XIV: A Realm Reborn and No Man's Sky, the updates since launch, particularly with the Wastelanders update included with the Steam release, had significantly improved the game, and that those interested in trying it should ignore the negative reviews.

Sales
Upon launch, Fallout 76 debuted at third place in the UK's all-format sales charts, behind Spyro Reignited Trilogy and Red Dead Redemption 2, and fifth place in the Switzerland all-format sales charts. According to the NPD Group, the game had lower launch sales than either Fallout 4 or Fallout: New Vegas. The game saw a price drop in North America less than one week after its initial release, with some pundits listing poor sales as a reason for the cut in price. In their respective opening months, the game's physical sales were less than one fifth of Fallout 4 (down 82%). In Japan, the PlayStation 4 version sold 73,489 copies within its debut week, which made it the second bestselling retail game of the week in the country.

SuperData estimated that, as of the end of 2018, the game had sold 1.4 million digital copies. In November 2021, Todd Howard revealed the game had 11 million players in total.

Accolades
Despite the mixed reviews, the game was nominated for "Fan Favorite Fall Release" at the Gamers' Choice Awards, for "Game of the Year" at the Australian Games Awards, and for the Tin Pan Alley Award for Best Music in a Game at the New York Game Awards.

Controversies

Fallout 76 Power Armor special edition drew controversy upon release. Bethesda advertised that the edition would include a canvas duffel bag, but a nylon one was included instead. Responding to customer complaints, Bethesda claimed that the bag had to be changed due to unavailability of materials, and initially stated the intention to take no action. The publisher received criticism for not making the change known beforehand, with Eurogamer pointing out that the bag's description on Bethesda's website had only changed to read "nylon" after complaints had been submitted. Critics pointed out this amount of currency was not enough to purchase the in-game postman uniform (700 atoms), which includes a canvas bag. Additionally, it was discovered that Bethesda had produced a different Fallout 76–themed canvas bag and given them for free to online influencers, further adding to the fan outrage. Bethesda announced on December 3, 2018, that they would be producing canvas bags for all owners of the Power Armor special edition, which were ultimately said to be shipping "in four to six months." In June 2019, the bags were delivered to customers.

A data breach occurred on December 5, 2018, when a glitch in Bethesda's support system revealed personal information of approximately 65 Fallout 76 customers who had submitted a support ticket to receive the canvas bag. Users were able to open and close tickets of other customers and view personal information, including names, addresses, emails and partial credit card information. In a statement given to Ars Technica, Bethesda said that the breach occurred via "an error with our customer support website" and that they are "investigating the incident and will provide additional updates as we learn more". The publisher clarified that the only information leaked were details that the support site would have requested, rather than credit card numbers or passwords, and that they would notify all affected customers.

In 2018, Bethesda partnered with the Silver Screen Bottling Company to create "Nuka Dark Rum", an alcoholic beverage based on the in-game "Nuka-Cola Dark" introduced in the Fallout 4: Nuka-World add-on. While its release was expected to coincide with the launch of Fallout 76, the rum was delayed and was shipped instead in late December 2018. Upon receiving it, fans criticized the fact that the rum bottle advertised, previously expected to be a bottle in the missile-like shape of the in-game Nuka-Cola item, had turned out to be a standard glass bottle encased in a large plastic cover. The rum's asking price of $80 was subsequently condemned from expectations that the design would be of high quality, since none of the marketing had stated what the bottles would be made of.

In September 2019, collectible "Nuka Cola"-themed Fallout helmets produced by Chronicle Collectibles, of which only 32 of the 20,000 manufactured were sold, were recalled by the U.S. Consumer Product Safety Commission due to containing high levels of mold and posing a health risk. No incidents or injuries were reported. GameStop, which sold the helmets, notified all customers who had purchased a helmet and offered them a full refund.

In June 2022, a Kotaku article published reports from ten anonymous former employees of Bethesda and its parent company ZeniMax Media of severe mismanagement during Fallout 76s development. The reports claimed that crunch had been enforced, leading to an "exodus" of senior developers from the company. The loss of staff led to Bethesda borrowing developers working on Arkane Studios' Redfall and Bethesda's Starfield to assist with Fallout 76. Other alleged issues included technical problems with the game's design and engine, as well as these concerns being ignored by senior management. The sources expressed cynicism towards an improvement of working conditions at Bethesda (following their acquisition by Microsoft), saying "It would be great if something like ABetterABK existed for Bethesda [...] But everyone is terrified...because [Bethesda] HR is super cutthroat."

Notes

References

External links

 

2018 video games
Action role-playing video games
Bethesda Game Studios games
Fallout (series) video games
Multiplayer online games
Open-world video games
PlayStation 4 games
Video game controversies
Video game prequels
Video games developed in the United States
Video games set in the 22nd century
Video games set in Pennsylvania
Video games set in Pittsburgh
Video games set in West Virginia
West Virginia folklore
Windows games
Works subject to a lawsuit
Xbox Cloud Gaming games
Xbox One games